Ferneyhough is a surname. Notable people with the surname include:

 Brian Ferneyhough (born 1943), English composer of modern classical music
 Jodie Ferneyhough, President of the Canadian Music Publishers Association

See also
 Fernyhough